Riaz Batalvi   (1937 – 15 January 2003) was a senior Pakistani journalist, writer and a  dramatist.

Early life and career
Riazul Hasan was born in February 1937 in Batala, Gurdaspur District in Punjab, India. His family migrated to Pakistan after the independence of Pakistan in 1947. First, he started working for Daily Kohistan newspaper which was edited by the veteran journalist and novelist Naseem Hijazi. Then he switched over to Daily Mashriq newspaper, when it was launched in 1963 and later became its editor.

As a playwright
Riaz Batalvi wrote a short story called Dubai Chalo which was well received by the public and was later turned into a highly popular movie by the same name - Dubai Chalo (1979). He also wrote a popular TV drama Aik Haqeeqat Aik Fasana for the Pakistani television.

Awards and recognition
Pride of Performance Award by the Government of Pakistan in 1986

Death
Riaz Batalvi died on 15 January 2003 at age 65 in Lahore, Pakistan.

References

External links
Riaz Batalvi on IMDb website

Pakistani male journalists
Writers from Lahore
Pakistani dramatists and playwrights
People from Gurdaspur
Journalists from Lahore
Recipients of the Pride of Performance
1937 births
2003 deaths